Eubenangee is a coastal locality split between the Cairns Region and the Cassowary Coast Region, Queensland, Australia.

Geography 

The larger northern part of the locality is in Cairns Region with the smaller southern part in the Cassowary Coast Region. The western part of the locality is very low-lying undeveloped wetland (approx 10 metres above sea level) and forms part of the Eubenangee Swamp National Park. In contrast the north-eastern part of the locality is mountainous undeveloped land rising to Mount Arthur (470 metres above sea level), part of being in the Ella Bay National Park. The developed land is mostly on the fringes of the Eubenangee Swamp National Park; it is mostly used for crop farming with sugarcane predominating.

Eubenangee is a watershed with the northern part of the locality draining towards the Russell River (which enters the Coral Sea between Deeral and East Russell) and the southern part of the locality draining towards the North Johnstone River (which having merged with the South Johnstone River into the Johnstone River enters the Coral Sea between Flying Fish Point and Coquette Point).

The Bruce Highway and North Coast railway passes through the south-east of the locality with the Waugh railway station serving the area. A cane tramway passes through the locality to take harvested sugarcane to the local sugar mills.

History 

The locality takes its name from the railway station name assigned by the Queensland Railways Department on 15 August 1918. In turn the railway station took its name from the extensive Eubenangee Swamp.

Eubenangee Provisional School opened in September 1921. In 1927 it became Eubenangee State School. It closed on 1971.

Education 
There are no schools in Eubenangee. The nearest primary schools are Mirriwinni State School in neighbouring Mirriwinni to the north-east and Goondi State School in Goondi Bend to the south-west. The nearest secondary schools are Babinda State School (Prep-12) in Babinda to the north-west and Innisfail State College in Innisfail Estate to the south-east.

References

External links 

Cairns Region
Cassowary Coast Region
Coastline of Queensland
Localities in Queensland